The General Mercantile Store was a building in Houston, Texas, listed on the National Register of Historic Places. The building was constructed in 1920 and was added to the National Register on June 4, 1997. It was delisted in August 2014.

See also
 National Register of Historic Places listings in Harris County, Texas

References

1920 establishments in Texas
Buildings and structures completed in 1920
Former National Register of Historic Places in Texas
National Register of Historic Places in Houston
Commercial buildings on the National Register of Historic Places in Texas